Ram Nath Adhikari is a Nepalese politician. He was elected to the Pratinidhi Sabha in the 1999 election on behalf of the Nepali Congress.

In the 2022 Nepalese general election, he was elected as the member of the 2nd Federal Parliament of Nepal.

References

Living people
Nepali Congress politicians from Bagmati Province
Nepal MPs 1999–2002
Nepal MPs 2022–present
1961 births